Tinea steueri is a moth belonging to the family Tineidae. The species was first described by Petersen in 1866.

It is native to Europe.

References

Tineinae
Moths described in 1866
Moths of Europe